Hassan bin Abdul Karim (born 1951; Jawi: حسن بن عبد الكريم) is a Malaysian politician. He is currently serving as Member of Parliament (MP) for Pasir Gudang constituency in Johor representing the People's Justice Party (PKR), a component party of Pakatan Harapan (PH) coalition since 2018. He was formerly the president of Malaysian People's Party (PRM).

Political career
Hassan, a lawyer by profession, joined PRM in 1978 before rising to become its youth chief. In April 2005, Hassan was elected president of PRM by party members who were against the party's merger with the National Justice Party into the People's Justice Party (PKR).

Following the party's rejection of Hassan's proposal for the party to enter into the Pakatan Rakyat (PR) opposition coalition during a party congress, he announced his intention to resign on 15 November 2009. Hassan then joined PKR later in the month, which was a component party of the PR coalition.

In the 2018 Malaysian general election, Hassan contested as a candidate for the Pasir Gudang parliamentary seat against the then-Menteri Besar of Johor, Mohamed Khaled Nordin in a four cornered-fight and was able to win the seat with a majority of 24,726 votes. On 4 December 2018, Hassan was elected chair of the Federal-State Relations Select Committee, one of the Parliamentary Committees of Malaysia.

Following Anwar's release from prison and return to the PKR presidency, Hassan was appointed PKR Johor state chairman in 2018. However, following multiple allegations of nepotism due to some of the appointees being allegedly linked to Anwar, Hassan decided to refuse the appointment on 14 December 2018. On 28 December 2018, he bolted and accepted the position. Hassan finally quit the position on 19 July 2019, citing differences with the Johor Palace.

Controversy
On 16 November 2015, Hassan was charged at the Shah Alam Sessions Court with three counts of making seditious statements via his public Twitter account in which he was alleged to have criticised the Selangor Sultan Sharafuddin Idris Shah being abroad during Selangor Mentri Besar crisis in 2014. He was discharged not amounting to an acquittal by the Sessions Court in May 2018, following the prosecution's decision to drop the charges. On 10 May 2019, he was finally granted a full acquittal on the sedition charges by the Shah Alam High Court.

Election results

See also
 Federal-State Relations Select Committee
 Pasir Gudang (federal constituency)

External links

References

Living people
1951 births
Malaysian people of Malay descent
Malaysian Muslims
20th-century Malaysian lawyers
Leaders of political parties in Malaysia
Parti Rakyat Malaysia politicians
People's Justice Party (Malaysia) politicians
Members of the Dewan Rakyat
University of Malaya alumni
Alumni of the University of London
21st-century Malaysian politicians